David Price Racing (commonly referred to as DPR) is a British motor racing team, founded by David Price.  The team competed in various forms of motorsport from their foundation in 1976 until 2008.  The team was sold in April 2009, but continued racing in GP2 and GP2 Asia Series under the name David Price Racing until 2010.

History
The team initially ran small single-seater series in Britain from the late 1970s, including British Formula 3 and Aurora F1. The team entered Giacomo Agostini's Williams FW06 in the Aurora-backed British F1 series in 1979 and 1980. Many future Formula drivers raced for the team, including Nigel Mansell, Martin Brundle, Johnny Dumfries and Tiff Needell. David Price Racing won the French F3 title in 1982 with Pierre Petit and the British F3 title with Dumfries in 1984. DPR drivers in French F3 also included Paul Belmondo, Fabien Giroix and François Hesnault from 1982 through 1986. Andrew Ridgeley, formerly of the pop duo Wham!, also ran with DPR in French F3, after the band split up.

In 1987, David Price moved into sports car racing, becoming a team manager for Richard Lloyd Racing.  Price was approached by Sauber-Mercedes in 1988, helping the team achieve the World Sportscar Championship and a 24 Hours of Le Mans victory in 1989.  David Price was then headhunted by Nissan Motorsports Europe to run their sportscar program, before eventually becoming director of racing at Brabham in Formula One in 1991.

David Price Racing returned to competition in 1995, running in the BPR Global GT Series. One of the multiple McLaren F1 GTR teams in the series, they won the team and drivers championship in their first year of competition with drivers John Nielsen and Thomas Bscher. The team also finished third at the 24 Hours of Le Mans that year, running the Harrods-sponsored McLaren with drivers Andy Wallace and Derek Bell and Justin Bell. In 1996, the team finished third in the BPR championship. DPR then became the European factory team for Panoz in 1997, running their Esperante GTR-1s in the new FIA GT Championship as well as supporting the primary team in the United States. In 1998, Price was in charge of the first hybrid car ever to attempt to qualify at Le Mans, the Panoz GT-1 hybrid.

During a brief interlude from Panoz, David Price Racing ran a BMW V12 LM at the 24 Hours of Le Mans, finishing fifth overall. The team would later return to support Panoz's own Le Mans prototype efforts in the American Le Mans Series and at Le Mans itself. Following the 2001 season, DPR went on hiatus. The team would briefly assist MG in development of the XPower SV for 2002.

In 2004, David Price Racing returned, once again running single-seater cars. They ran the Formula Renault V6 Eurocup series before moving into the new GP2 Series in 2005, winning two races with Olivier Pla. The team briefly changed their name to Direxiv in 2006, before returning to the David Price Racing name in 2007. The team also ran the A1 Grand Prix series for A1 Team USA during the 2005–06 season.

Years after selling the team, Price had been involved in the DeltaWing Le Mans Prototype program since 2013.

Price passed away on 15 February 2023 aged 75.

Series results

GP2 Series 
(key) (Races in bold indicate pole position) (Races in italics indicate fastest lap)

References

External links
 David Price Racing
 David Price profile

British auto racing teams
A1 Grand Prix racing teams
GP2 Series teams
24 Hours of Le Mans teams
American Le Mans Series teams
FIA GT Championship teams
FIA Sportscar Championship entrants
Auto racing teams established in 1976
1976 establishments in the United Kingdom
Auto racing teams disestablished in 2010
2010 disestablishments in the United Kingdom
FIA European Formula 3 Championship teams
French Formula 3 teams
German Formula 3 teams
British Formula Three teams